Lisa-Jayne Lewis is a British, broadcaster and commentator at the Eurovision Song Contest and Junior Eurovision Song Contest. She's provided relief support for multiple disasters and manages an artist.

Early life 
Lisa-Jayne Lewis was born in Aldershot, Hampshire. She moved as a child to Guildford, Surrey and was educated at Bishop Reindorp School.

Eurovision Song Contest and Junior Eurovision Song Contest 
Along with Ewan Spence and Ana Filipa Rosa, Lewis was a commentator for the first USA Radio broadcast of 2018 Eurovision Song Contest from Lisbon, Portugal.

Lewis provided English language international commentary at the Junior Eurovision Song Contest 2016 from Valletta, Malta and the Junior Eurovision Song Contest 2017 from Tbilisi, Georgia.

Since 2016, and following the departure of Luke Fisher in 2015, Lewis has been co-commentator with Ewan Spence on the Unofficial Alternative Online Commentary of the semi finals (2016, 2017, 2018) and the grand final (2016, 2017). Neither Spence nor Lewis covered the grand final in 2018 as they were commentating for USA Radio. For a number of years, Lewis also presented Eurovision content on Radio 6 International, bringing daily news and reporting from backstage at the contest.

From 2019 Lewis has covered both Eurovision and Junior Eurovision as part of Gateway Community Media's 'All Out Eurovision' team, producing & hosting radio programming that is syndicated to a number of radio stations in the Switch Radio network broadcasting in the UK and Gibraltar.

Personal life 
Lewis moved to Boston, Massachusetts in 2000 and spent six years living in the USA during which time she was a soldier and officer (ordained minister) of The Salvation Army. She provided disaster relief support following the 9/11 attacks on the World Trade Center where she worked as an on-site night chaplain. In 2005 she worked as part of the Gulf Coast Logistics Management team in the aftermath of Hurricane Katrina. Subsequent to her work at Ground Zero, she suffers with PTSD as well as breathing problems as a result of asbestos inhalation. During her time with The Salvation Army she lived in the Jubilee House in Dorchester, the former home of Jordan and Jonathan Knight from New Kids on the Block. 

Lewis now lives in Herefordshire. She is named on the Lesbian and Gay Christian Movement 'Rainbow List', a list of influential LGBT Christians in the UK. In 2019 Lewis became a trustee of the charity OneBodyOneFaith (formerly the Lesbian and Gay Christian Movement) she openly identifies as bisexual/pansexual.

During the 2017 Eurovision season she became close friends with Montenegrin representative Slavko Kalezić, who she now manages. She accompanied Slavko all through his time on The X Factor UK and can be seen in a number of clips alongside him.

References

External links 
 Official website

1977 births
Living people
Mass media people from Aldershot
Pansexual women
Bisexual women
English bisexual people
English LGBT broadcasters
British radio personalities